Dactylopus dactylopus, known commonly as the Fingered dragonet, is a species of marine fish in the family Callionymidae.

The Fingered dragonet is widespread throughout the tropical waters of the central Indo-Pacific region from Indonesia to  Palau Islands.

This species reaches a length of  TL.

This species can be found in the aquarium trade.

References

External links
http://www.marinespecies.org/aphia.php?p=taxdetails&id=278368
 

Dactylopus
Fish described in 1837